This article details Crewe Alexandra's 2009–10 season in League Two, their 86th competitive season in the English Football League.

Events 

This is a list of the significant events to occur at the club before and during the 2009–10 season, presented in chronological order.

2009

Pre-season
 2 May: Crewe are relegated to League Two after a 3–0 loss at home to League One champions Leicester City.
 7 May: Manager Gudjon Thordarson releases 10 players from the squad, including captain Julien Baudet to the MLS, leading to 19 players being left from the previous season.
 19 May: Pre-season games are announced against three Premier League sides, Wigan Athletic, a Wolverhampton Wanderers select XI and Birmingham City.
 21 May: Crewe announce their first signing of the summer, with central defender Patrick Ada signing from Histon, while assistant manager, Neil Baker, leaves his position.
 4 June: Chief scout Glyn Chamberlain leaves the club after four years. and Crewe make their first sale for money after Tom Pope agrees a £150,000 move to Rotherham United.
 17 June: The same day the fixtures are released, Crewe announce that Nantwich Town manager Steve Davis has been appointed new assistant manager.
 5 July: Prior to a 7–0 win over Newcastle Town in a friendly, Billy Jones is made the forthcoming season's captain, with Anthony Elding as vice-captain.

2009–10 season begins- August 

 8 August: Crewe start off their season with a 2–1 defeat at home by Dagenham & Redbridge.
 11 August: Crewe's League Cup campaign ends in the First Round after a 2–1 defeat at home to Championship side Blackpool.
 15 August: Crewe get their two away wins of the season after a 0–4 win over Grimsby Town, then a narrow 0–1 win over Darlington three days later.
 20 August: Tottenham Hotspur recall on-loan 'keeper David Button.
 22 August: Crewe get their first win at home, and a third straight clean sheet with a 1–0 win over Hereford United after Billy Jones scored the rebound from his saved penalty kick.
 29 August: Crewe fail to score for the first time this season, and suffer their first away loss after losing at Bournemouth 1–0.

September 
 1 September: Crewe lose in the Football League Trophy to Stockport County, the first Cheshire derby of the season. and re-sign David Button on loan until 3 January.
 5 September: Crewe's second Cheshire derby of the season ends with a Crewe win, 2–1 against Macclesfield Town at home, to send Crewe up to fifth in the table.
 12 September: Crewe travel 30 miles to Shrewsbury Town, where their inconsistent season continues with a 2–0 loss.
 19 September: Crewe's 23 shots against Aldershot Town's six do not help as they lose 2–1.
 25 September: Crewe honour Accrington Stanley's request to play on a Friday night to help with Accrington's debt, but end up losing 5–3.
 29 September: Crewe have two men sent off in a match for the first time since 1996, in a 3–2 loss at home to Bury, with former Crewe striker Ryan Lowe scoring for the visitors.

October 
 2 October: Crewe part company with Gudjon Thordarson with immediate effect after a board meeting, with Dario Gradi again taking the position as caretaker manager.
 9 October: Bolton Wanderers recall on loan goalkeeper Ádám Bogdán.
 24 October: After Crewe lose away at Notts County, striker Anthony Elding is placed on the transfer list.
 27 October: Tottenham Hotspur recall on loan 'keeper David Button again.

November 
 7 November: Crewe lose in the First Round of the FA Cup to Blue Square Premier side York City.
 21 November: Following Crewe's 2–2 draw away at Northampton Town, Crewe become the last Football League side to draw a game in the new season.

December 
 2 December: Steve Phillips saves two penalties as Crewe are the first team to win at Saltergate this season after a 3–2 win at 5th placed Chesterfield.
 5 December: Crewe draw at home with Lincoln City 0–0, Crewe's first no-score draw of the season, and first since April 2009.
 12 December: Crewe become the first team to beat Barnet at home after a 1–2 win. Matthew Tootle is later cleared of diving by the FA, but his yellow card is not rescinded.
 19 December: Crewe's home match with Torquay United is postponed due to a frozen pitch at The Alexandra Stadium.
 26 December: Crewe come from behind twice to secure a 2–2 draw with top of the table Rochdale, who were looking for a record sixth successive away win.
 28 December: Crewe's final match of 2009 is a 4–1 loss away at Macclesfield Town. The result means Crewe finish the year in 12th position in the league.
 29 December: Harry Worley's loan is extended until the end of the season.

2010

January 
 1 January: Crewe's first two games of the New Year against Hereford and Grimsby are postponed, due to the heavy snow around Britain.
 5 January: Striker Anthony Elding and the club agree to mutually terminate Eldgin's contract with immediate effect.
 6 January: Steve Phillips extends his loan until 30 May.

February 
 23 February: Crewe's match with Chesterfield is put back by 24 hours due to a bad weather forecast.

March 
 19 March: Crewe sign Lancaster City striker Jordan Connerton for an undisclosed fee on a three-year contract. Crewe loan Connerton back to Lancaster City for the remainder of the season. A-Jay Leitch-Smith also goes out on loan, to Curzon Ashton until the end of the season.

April 
 26 April: Ashley Westwood is awarded the Player of the Season award at the Crewe ASi Award Night. Westwood also picked up the Newcomer of the Season award, whilst Calvin Zola's goal against Bradford City on 10 October is voted as the Goal of the Season.
 27 April: Crewe retain the Cheshire Premier Cup after an extra-time win over Macclesfield Town at Gresty Road.

May 

 1 May: Assistant Manager Steve Davis takes control of the first team's goalless draw at Rotherham United whilst Dario Gradi went on scouting duties.
 8 May: Crewe's final match of the season is a 1–0 loss at home to Bradford City, leaving Crewe finishing 18th in the league table.

Players

Squad information 

Appearances (starts and substitute appearances) and goals include those in the League (and playoffs), FA Cup, League Cup and Football League Trophy.

Squad stats

Disciplinary record

Awards

Individual

Players in and out

In

Out

Club

Coaching staff

Other information

Kits

Competitions

Overall

League Two

Table

Results summary

Results by round

Matches

Pre-season friendlies 

1. Razak was a trialist for this game, which ended on 13 July.
Last updated: 5 August 2009

League Two 

Last updated: 11 May 2010

Football League Cup

Last updated: 15 August 2009

Football League Trophy 

Last updated: 1 September 2009

FA Cup 

Last updated: 8 November 2009

References 

The following references are from crewealex.net, unless otherwise specified.

External links 

Official Website
Sky Sports
BBC Football

Crewe Alexandra
Crewe Alexandra F.C. seasons